The Malaysian United Indigenous Party, abbreviated BERSATU or PPBM, is a nationalist political party in Malaysia. The party was preceded by the United Indigenous Association of Malaysia. It is a major component party within the Perikatan Nasional coalition. BERSATU was approved and fully registered on 14 January 2017 by the Registrar of Societies (ROS) and the use of the BERSATU logo was authorized by the Malaysian Election Commission (SPR). The party held the Prime Ministerial position as well as the majority of positions in the cabinet from May 2020 to August 2021. The party's founding members came from the United Malays National Organisation (UMNO) and Barisan Nasional rebel group Gabungan Ketua Cawangan Malaysia in 2016.

Full membership in the party is limited to only Bumiputeras (indigenous communities of Malaysia). Non-Bumiputeras can join the party as associate members, although they are not eligible to vote and run in party elections. However, qualified individuals can be appointed to certain key party posts.

History

Formation 
On 10 August 2016, former UMNO Deputy President Muhyiddin Yassin submitted a registration application for BERSATU. The party's leadership consisted of Muhyiddin as president, Mukhriz Mahathir as vice-president, and Mahathir Mohamad as chairman. BERSATU's formation was undertaken by former members of UMNO in opposition to the then-prime minister Najib Razak.

On 12 November 2016, the party committed to joining the opposition coalition Pakatan Harapan, which then consisted of the Parti Keadilan Rakyat, the Democratic Action Party, and the Parti Amanah Negara. The coalition awaited a decision from the Malaysian Islamic Party, a member of the opposition. Later, on 13 December, the party formally joined Pakatan Harapan by signing the Cooperation and Common Framework Agreement.

2018 general election 
On 7 January 2018, Pakatan Harapan announced BERSATU chairman Mahathir Mohamad as the coalition's prime ministerial candidate.

On 10 May 2018, one day after the election, Mahathir claimed victory, ending Barisan Nasional and UMNO's rule over the country. The parties had ruled the country since its independence, during which time Mahathir had participated as prime minister from 1981 to 2003. Mahathir was sworn in as Malaysia's fourth Prime Minister for the second time at 93 years of age, making him the world's oldest head of government.

On 18 September 2018, UMNO veteran Mustapa Mohamed left the party, citing disagreements with UMNO's party direction, and later joined BERSATU on 27 October. This foreshadowed an exodus of UMNO members, which began with Sabah UMNO on 12 December, as nine of its ten state assemblymen, five of its six MPs, and two senators left to join BERSATU. On 14 December 2018, six UMNO MPs left the party, including former minister Hamzah Zainudin, who claimed that an additional 36 Barisan Nasional MPs had signed a pledge of allegiance to Prime Minister Mahathir. The six MPs remained independents before officially joining BERSATU on 12 February 2019.

Collapse of the Pakatan Harapan government 
On 24 February 2020, Mahathir resigned as the Prime Minister. BERSATU, which had 26 MPs, withdrew from the ruling Pakatan Harapan coalition. In addition, 11 MPs from Parti Keadilan Rakyat (PKR) resigned from the party to form an independent bloc. This left the Pakatan Harapan government without a majority in parliament. The surprise announcement came amid speculation that Mahathir was attempting to form a new ruling coalition that would exclude his designated successor, Anwar Ibrahim. However, Anwar later clarified to reporters that Mahathir did not orchestrate the act. At 9 pm, BERSATU leaders held an emergency meeting at its headquarters to discuss the future direction of the party. Members of Bersatu rejected Mahathir's resignation as the party's chairman and pledged their support for him to be the prime minister. The party's secretary-general Marzuki Yahya said that the members of BERSATU's supreme council were unanimous in their support for Mahathir. The member parties of Pakatan Harapan also announced their support for Mahathir to remain as prime minister in the aftermath of his resignation.

On 26 February, Azmin and the 10 other MPs who left PKR announced that they were joining BERSATU amid rumours that Pakatan Harapan MPs would abandon support for Mahathir. The 10 other MPs are Zuraida Kamaruddin, Saifuddin Abdullah, Baru Bian, Kamarudin Jaffar, Mansor Othman, Rashid Hasnon, Ali Biju, Willie Mongin and Jonathan Yasin.

On 28 February, BERSATU then released a statement announcing their support for the party's president, Muhyiddin Yassin for the position of prime minister, backed by the 26 Bersatu MPs and 10 others led by Azmin. However, BERSATU Supreme Council member Kadir Jasin claimed he was never invited for a discussion or informed about Muhyiddin's nomination. This was followed by 60 MPs from UMNO, PAS, Malaysian Chinese Association and Malaysian Indian Congress also announcing their support for Muhyiddin, with all of UMNO's and PAS' MPs signing statutory declarations supporting Muhyiddin. Muhyiddin Yassin's aide also confirmed that Azmin Ali and 10 other former PKR MPs have officially joined BERSATU the same day.

On 29 February, BERSATU Youth chief Syed Saddiq declared that he would never work with those involved in corruption to form a government, referring to UMNO. BERSATU's youth wing Armada posted a statement to say that it would continue to back the party's supreme council's decision in its meeting on 24 February to support Mahathir as prime minister, suggesting a split within Bersatu over Mahathir and Muhyiddin's candidacy.

Formation of the Perikatan Nasional government 
BERSATU President, Muhyiddin Yassin and his allies including party leaders from UMNO, PAS, Gabungan Parti Sarawak, Parti Bersatu Rakyat Sabah, and Homeland Solidarity Party had an audience with the Yang di-Pertuan Agong to discuss the formation of a government, and announced that the coalition consisting of Bersatu, UMNO, PAS, PBRS, GPS, and STAR will be called Perikatan Nasional. The new coalition claimed that they had majority support in parliament to elect a Prime Minister and to form a government.

Muhyiddin Yassin was sworn in as the eighth prime minister in front of the Agong at the Istana Negara on the morning of 1 March 2020.

On the morning of 2 March, Muhyiddin arrived at the Perdana Putra building, which functions as the Prime Minister's Office, to begin his official duties as the Prime Minister. Muhyiddin held meetings with Chief Secretary Mohd Zuki Ali, General Affendi Buang, the Chief of Defence Forces, and Abdul Hamid Bador, the Inspector-General of Police. Later that night, Muhyiddin addressed the nation in his first televised message as the prime minister. In his address, he told the nation that he had no prior intention to become the prime minister and denied being a traitor but due to the political turmoil in the country, he had stepped up in order to avoid prolonging the crisis further. He also reassured that he will only choose individuals who are clean, virtuous and of high calibre to be in his cabinet. Before ending his message, he thanked former prime minister Mahathir for his service to the country.

On 19 May, it was revealed that BERSATU had received a letter on 5 May from the Registrar of Societies stating that Mahathir was no longer party chairman after his resignation in February. The letter also confirmed the legality of Muhyiddin assuming the role of chairman until an election was held.

On 28 May, Mahathir Mohamad, Mukhriz Mahathir, Syed Saddiq, Maszlee Malik and Amiruddin Hamzah were expelled from Bersatu. They decried the move as illegal and reflective of Muhyiddin's insecurities and dictatorial leadership. In a joint statement, they disputed the interpretation of their decision not to join Muhyiddin's government benches in Parliament as joining another party, which results in automatic revocation of memberships, according to the party constitution. Muhyiddin defended the expulsion and insisted that the five members who were removed from the party as having breached the party constitution by sitting with the opposition in Parliament.

On 4 June, Deputy Works Minister Shahruddin Md Salleh of BERSATU resigned from his position, calling his decision to join the Perikatan Nasional government "incorrect" and adding that he should have considered his constituents who "voted for Pakatan Harapan" in 2018. On 19 July, his BERSATU membership was terminated after he submitted a notice changing the position of his seat in the Dewan Rakyat from the government bloc to the opposition bloc.

On 6 June, former UMNO member Syed Abu Hussin Hafiz, MP for Bukit Gantang, submitted an application form to join the party. Present were Bersatu MPs Senior Minister for Economy and Minister of International Trade and Industry, Azmin Ali and Deputy Minister of Energy and Natural Resources Ali Biju.

Fall of Perikatan Nasional and formation of BN-led government 
On 16 August 2021, Muhyiddin Yassin and his cabinet tendered their resignation to the Agong due to the loss of majority in the Dewan Rakyat, causing the party to lose the PM post that the party has held since the 2018 general election. On 20 August 2021, Bersatu and the other parties in the PN coalition choose to support Ismail Sabri Yaakob of UMNO as the Prime Minister of Malaysia, thus giving him a simple majority in the Dewan Rakyat and was chosen as Prime Minister.

GRS Party registration approval in RoS 
The GRS party registration letter was sent on 26 February 2022 and confirmed by Datuk Seri Panglima Haji Hajiji Noor (BERSATU Sabah State Chairman) in his press statement to BERNAMA reporters.

This political party was legalised as an official single entity coalition party on 11 March 2022 and approved by Registrar of Societies (RoS).

Datuk Seri Panglima Haji Hajiji Noor said, The GRS Party's BERSATU Sabah Branch and PN-BERSATU of Peninsular Malaysia will be two different parties with ideological differences. BERSATU Sabah will give priority to the natives of Sabah, including all citizens of Sabah.

Controversies

Breach Violation of COVID-19 Prevention SOP 
On 29 Jul 2021, a few Bersatu members from the women wing have been caught red-handed as they breach the SOP violation by dancing at a hotel near Glenmerie while the citizens of Malaysia are forced to stay at homes. Some members are caught not wearing face masks and practising social distancing. This has been investigated by the police and the police said they will take further action. Rina Harun said that she is in no way involved in this situation.	
	
On 29 Jun 2021, Mohd Rashid Hasnon and a group of suspected majority from bersatu politicians are caught red-handed in a video showing them breaching violation of COVID-19 prevention SOP procedures violation for having a durian fest in Johor Baharu, Johor. Rashid initially denied stating that it was taken place last year and before the SOP was imposed. However, netizens and police have found reasonable evidence that Rashid was indeed lying. Rashid eventually gave in that he did violate SOP procedures and apologies to the media. He said that he will cooperate with the police for the investigation and face the consequences. Zuraida Kamaruddin was also seen in the photo as well, but she denies attending a durian feast.

Suspicious fraudulent majority support 
On 4 August 2021, Putrajaya, Muhyiddin Yassin submitted a motion of confidence to the Yang di Pertuan Agong of Malaysia stating that he had received numerous declarations which provided that he still had the majority support within the lower house of parliament Dewan Rakyat. Therefore, the action of resignation under Federal Constitution of Malaysia under section 43(4) is not valid nor legal. He stated that the motion of no confidence will take place in September if the parliament has doubts of his ruling. However, this statement has been rejected by opposition leader Anwar Ibrahim, who claims that 112 or more MPs have rejected Perikatan Nasional. Therefore, Anwar Ibrahim's statement concludes that Muyhiddin claims is not valid and potentially fraudulent.
	
Following Anwar Ibrahim's statement, On 6 August 2021, Muhyiddin had stated during a press conference in Pagoh, Johor that he is still confident that he still hold majority support within the Parliament.

Refusal of resignation as Prime Minister of Malaysia 
Following Perikatan Nasional loss of Majority support, Muhyiddin Yassin had conducted a press statement on 13 August 2021 which states he will not be resigning despite he has lost the majority support. He also said that he will be waiting on the upcoming vote of confidence which will be taken place in September because he does not believe that there is a political party or coalition that holds a majority currently, and he may fear for a catastrophic disaster if new government to be form to control the COVID-19 pandemic in Malaysia is late like vaccination process. He urges the opposition to stand on his side. He said "If the government (Perikatan Nasional Government) gets bipartisan support (support from any opposition) in Dewan Rakyat and Dewan Negara which is more than 2/3 majority, an amendment will be made to the Constitution (Federal Constitution of Malaysia) to introduce a two term limit to the Prime Minister's post and Anti Hopping Laws will be also tabled in the parliament".

Instigation of Sheraton Move

Following the Political Infighting within Pakatan Harapan Government, Bersatu President Muhyiddin Yassin together with PAS President Abdul Hadi Awang and PKR defected members led by Azmin Ali formed the Perikatan Nasional and working alongside UMNO leaders Abdul Hadi Awang and Ismail Sabri Yaakob to causing a power vacuum after then Prime Minister Mahathir Mohamad resignation then simple majority in the Malaysian Government causing much political instability which led to Malaysian political crisis.

Ideology 
The main objectives of the party are:
 Islam will remain the religion of the Federation, and the right of non-Muslims to profess and practice their religion in peace and harmony will be respected.
 Upholding the dignity and sovereignty of the institution of the Malay Rulers.
 Maintain the special position of the Malays and natives of Sabah and Sarawak and the legitimate rights of all communities.
 Empowering Malay as the national language and to preserve the rights of all people to learn their native language.
 Uphold parliamentary democracy and the doctrine of separation of powers by strengthening democratic institutions through comprehensive institutional reform.
 Strengthening the agenda against corruption and abuse of power to establish good governance practices, honesty and integrity;
 Maintaining people's fundamental rights as enshrined in the Federal Constitution, upholding the values of universal justice in line with the Islamic religion, and uphold the supremacy of the constitution, rule of laws and principles of justice and equality.
 Forming a Malaysian society that is inclusive, progressive, dynamic and scientific and appreciate art, culture and tradition as a reference to build a prosperous and developed country.
 Fighting for social justice, distribution of national wealth, welfare of the people and eradicating poverty irrespective of race and religion.
 Supporting the principle that every citizen has the right to succeed in obtaining a quality education and to perfect themselves through an education system that emphasises the development of talent, creativity and innovation, and that practices values and implements policies and initiatives that are consistent with bridging the gap between urban and rural areas.
 Fostering unity and harmony among the people of various races and religions, maintaining political stability and national security, and spur sustainable economic development in the interest of the people and the country.
 Applying the party's principles as National Principles and supporting the Federal Constitution and the State Constitutions.

List of leaders 
Chairman

President

Deputy President

Youth Chief

Leadership structure 

 President:
 Muhyiddin Yassin
 Deputy President:
 Ahmad Faizal Azumu
 Vice-president:
 Ronald Kiandee
 Radzi Jidin
 Srikandi Chief:
 Rina Harun
 ARMADA Chief:
 Wan Ahmad Fayhsal
 Srikandi Muda Chief:
 Nurul Fadzilah Kamaluddin
 Associate Chief:
 Chong Fat Full
 Secretary-General:
Hamzah Zainuddin
 Treasurer-General:
  Mohamed Salleh Bajuri
 Information Chief:
 Razali Idris 
 Executive Secretary:
 Muhammad Suhaimi Yahya 
 Party Election Committee Chairman:
 Syed Hamid Albar
 Party Constitution Amendment Committee Chairman: 
 Mas Ermieyati Samsudin
 Disciplinary Board Chairman:
 Megat Najmuddin Megat Khas
 Appeal Board Chairman:
 Mohd Radzi Sheikh Ahmad
 Political Bureau Chairman:
 Muhyiddin Yassin
 Management Bureau Chairman:
 Ahmad Faizal Azumu
 Election and Research Bureau Chairman:
 Ronald Kiandee
 Training and Cadre Bureau Chairman:
 Mohd Radzi Md Jidin
 Member and Branch Recruitment Bureau Chairman: 
 Vacant
 Religion Bureau Chairman:
 Shabudin Yahaya
 Economy Bureau Chairman:
 Mustapa Mohamed
 International Bureau Chairman: 
 Mohamed Azmin Ali
 Supreme Leadership Council Members (elected):
 Ikmal Hisham Abdul Aziz
 Abdul Hakim Gulam Hassan
 Zainol Fadzi Paharudin
 Iskandar Dzulkarnain Abdul Khalid
 Razali Idris
 Eddin Syazlee Shith
 Mustapa Mohamed
 Wan Saiful Wan Jan
 Azlinda Abdul Latif
 Taufik Yaacob
 Mohd Rafiq Mohd Abdullah
 Suhaili Abdul Rahman
 Sahruddin Jamal
 Mohamed Farid Mohamed Zawawi
 Mohd Zulkifli Zakaria 
 Mohd Yazid Mohd Yunus
 Shabudin Yahaya
 Rosol Wahid
 Shamsilah Siru
 Supreme Leadership Council Members (appointed):
 Mohd Redzuan Md Yusof
 Abdul Latiff Ahmad
 Abdul Rashid Asari
 Radzi Sheikh Ahmad
 Muhammad Faiz Na'man
 State Chairman:
 Johor: Sahruddin Jamal
 Kedah: Suhaimi Abdullah
 Kelantan: Kamarudin Mohd. Nor
 Malacca: Mohd Yadzil Yaakub
 Negeri Sembilan: Eddin Syazlee Shith
 Pahang: Saifuddin Abdullah
 Perak: Ahmad Faizal Azumu
 Perlis: Abu Bakar Hamzah
 Penang: Shabudin Yahaya
 Sarawak: Jaziri Alkaf Suffian
 Sabah: Ronald Kiandee
 Selangor: Abdul Rashid Asari
 Terengganu: Razali Idris
 Federal Territory: Suhaili Abdul Rahman
</div>

Elected representatives

Dewan Negara (Senate)

Senators 

 His Majesty's appointee:
 Aknan Ehtook (Siamese)
 Md Nasir Hashim
 Razali Idris
 Rais Yatim
 Jaziri Alkaf Suffian
 Zahid Arip (Kuala Lumpur)

Dewan Rakyat (House of Representatives)

Members of Parliament of the 15th Malaysian Parliament 

BERSATU has 31 members in the House of Representatives.

Dewan Undangan Negeri (State Legislative Assembly)

Malaysian State Assembly Representatives 

Perak State Legislative Assembly
Kedah State Legislative Assembly
Perlis State Legislative Assembly
Selangor State Legislative Assembly

Penang State Legislative Assembly
Malacca State Legislative Assembly
Johor State Legislative Assembly

Pahang State Legislative Assembly
Kelantan State Legislative Assembly
Sabah State Legislative Assembly

Terengganu State Legislative Assembly
Negeri Sembilan State Legislative Assembly
Sarawak State Legislative Assembly

General election results

State election results

See also 
 Parti Pribumi Bersatu Malaysia Sabah
 List of political parties in Malaysia
 Malaysian General Election
 Politics of Malaysia
 Pakatan Harapan
 Perikatan Nasional
 2020–21 Malaysian political crisis

References

External links 

 
 

 
Political parties established in 2016
Political parties in Malaysia
2016 establishments in Malaysia
Islamic political parties in Malaysia
Malaysian nationalism
Social conservative parties